Itumeleng Baldwin Moseki (born 1940) was the eleventh Bishop of Kimberley and Kuruman from 1995 until his retirement in 2006. He was also a campaigner for the poor.

References

1940 births
Living people
South African Tswana people
Anglican bishops of Kimberley and Kuruman